A recommendation in the European Union, according to Article 288 of the Treaty on the Functioning of the European Union (formerly Article 249 TEC), is one of two kinds of non-legal binding acts cited in the Treaty of Rome.

Recommendations are without legal force but are negotiated and voted on according to the appropriate procedure. Recommendations differ from regulations, directives and decisions, in that they are not binding for Member States. Though without legal force, they do have a political weight. The recommendation is an instrument of indirect action aiming at preparation of legislation in Member States, differing from the Directive only by the absence of obligatory power.

Article 292 notes that the European Commission may make recommendations, and in specific cases the European Central Bank may also make recommendations.

Common market
According to the terms of the Treaty on European Union "In order to ensure the proper functioning and development of the common market, the Commission (…) formulate recommendations or deliver opinions on matters dealt with in this Treaty, if it expressively so provides or if the Commission considers it necessary."

Concretely, recommendations can be used by the commission to raze barriers of competition caused by the establishment or the modification of internal norms of a Member State. If a country does not conform to a recommendation, the Commission cannot propose the adoption of a Directive aimed at other Member Countries, in order to elide this distortion.

See also
 EUR-Lex

References

External links
 EUROPA

Recommendation